This was the first edition of the tournament.

Diego Hidalgo and Cristian Rodríguez won the title after defeating Alejandro Gómez and Thiago Agustín Tirante 6–3, 4–6, [10–3] in the final.

Seeds

Draw

References

External links
 Main draw

Ambato La Gran Ciudad - Doubles